The Brooklyn Nets are an American professional basketball team based in the New York City borough of Brooklyn. They are a member of the Atlantic Division of the Eastern Conference in the National Basketball Association (NBA). The team plays its home games at the Barclays Center. The franchise was founded as the New Jersey Americans in 1967, and was one of the eleven original American Basketball Association (ABA) teams. In its second ABA season, Arthur Brown, the team owner, moved the team to Long Island and renamed it the New York Nets. The team won ABA championships in 1974 and 1976. When the ABA merged with the NBA in 1976, the Nets were one of four ABA teams admitted into the NBA. The team was moved to the Rutgers Athletic Center in New Jersey; after the 1976–77 NBA season, the team was renamed the New Jersey Nets. Since they joined the NBA, the Nets have won 4 divisional championships, 2 conference championships and appeared in the playoffs 16 times. The Nets moved to Brooklyn in 2012, and now play as the Brooklyn Nets.

There have been 24 head coaches for the Nets franchise. The franchise's first head coach was Max Zaslofsky, who led the team for two seasons. Kevin Loughery is the only Nets coach to have led the team to a championship; the Nets won ABA championships in 1974 and 1976 during his tenure. Loughery is the franchise's all-time leader in regular season games coached (615) and wins (297); P. J. Carlesimo is the franchise's all-time leader in regular season winning percentage (.648). Byron Scott is the franchise's all-time leader in playoff games coached (40) and wins (25), as well as playoff-game winning percentage (.625). Chuck Daly and Bill Fitch were selected as two of the top 10 coaches in NBA history. Daly, Brown and Lou Carnesecca are the only Nets coaches to have been inducted into the Basketball Hall of Fame as coaches. Zaslofsky, York Larese, Lou Carnesecca, Dave Wohl, Butch Beard, John Calipari, Tom Barrise, and Kiki Vandeweghe spent their entire coaching careers with the Nets/Americans.

Key

Coaches
Note: Statistics are correct as of the firing of Steve Nash on November 1, 2022.

Notes

References
General

Specific

Lists of National Basketball Association head coaches by team

Head coaches